This is a list of public school districts in Oregon, a U.S. state. The Oregon Department of Education has authority over public schools. Oregon has 188 public school districts.

History
In previous eras, the state had around 2,000 school districts. This figure was down to 365 in 1969.

Types of districts
Oregon's elementary and secondary school districts include unified,
component elementary, union high and unified elementary districts. Unified districts serve students from kindergarten to twelfth grade, union high school districts serve students in seventh or ninth grades through twelfth grade who reside within the district's boundaries and have attended component elementary districts within the district's boundaries. Component elementary districts are financially responsible for educating students from kindergarten through the sixth or eighth grades. A component district is wholly within a single union high school district. Elementary, or unified elementary, districts operate the same programs as component districts but are also financially responsible for providing for their students' high school education. These districts do this through tuition arrangements with districts that have seventh or ninth through twelfth-grade programs.

There is one union high school district, Harney County Union High School District, that operates a single school: Crane Union High School. The eight component elementary school districts are Crane, Diamond, Double O, Drewsey, Frenchglen, Pine Creek, Suntex and South Harney. The unified elementary districts include Adel, Annex, Arock, Ashwood, Black Butte, Juntura, McDermitt, Pinehurst, Plush and Troy.

A

 Adel School District 
 Adrian School District 
 Alsea School District
 Amity School District
 Annex School District, Ontario
 Arlington School District
 Arock School District
 Ashland School District
 Ashwood School District
 Astoria School District
 Athena-Weston School District

B

 Baker School District, Baker City
 Bandon School District
 Banks School District 
 Beaverton School District 
 Bend-La Pine School District 
 Bethel School District, Eugene
 Blachly School District
 Black Butte School District, Camp Sherman
 Brookings-Harbor School District
 Burnt River School District, Unity
 Butte Falls School District

C

 Camas Valley School District
 Canby School District
 Cascade School District, Turner
 Centennial School District, Portland
 Central School District, Independence
 Central Curry School District, Gold Beach
 Central Linn School District, Brownsville
 Central Point School District (formerly Jackson County School District)
 Clatskanie School District
 Colton School District
 Condon School District
 Coos Bay School District
 Coquille School District
 Corbett School District
 Corvallis School District
 Cove School District
 Creswell School District
 Crook County School District, Prineville
 Crow-Applegate-Lorane School District
 Culver School District

D

 Dallas School District
 David Douglas School District, Portland
 Days Creek School District (Douglas County School District 15)
 Dayton School District
 Dayville School District
 Diamond School District
 Double O School District, Hines
 Drewsey School District
 Dufur School District

E

 Eagle Point School District
 Echo School District
 Elgin School District
 Elkton School District
 Enterprise School District
 Estacada School District
 Eugene School District

F

 Falls City School District
 Fern Ridge School District, Elmira
 Forest Grove School District
 Fossil School District
 Frenchglen School District

G

 Gaston School District
 Gervais School District
 Gladstone School District
 Glendale School District
 Glide School District
 Grants Pass School District
 Greater Albany Public School District
 Gresham-Barlow School District

H

 Harney County School District 3, Burns
 Harney County School District 4 (Crane Elementary School District), Crane
 Harney County Union High School District (Crane Union High School District), Crane
 Harper School District
 Harrisburg School District
 Helix School District
 Hermiston School District
 Hillsboro School District
 Hood River County School District, Hood River
 Huntington School District

I

 Imbler School District
 Ione School District

J

 Jefferson County School District, Madras
 Jewell School District
 John Day School District (Grant County School District), Canyon City
 Jordan Valley School District
 Joseph School District
 Junction City School District
 Juntura School District

K

 Klamath County School District
 Klamath Falls City Schools
 Knappa School District

L

 La Grande School District
 Lake County School District (Lakeview School District)
 Lake Oswego School District
 Lebanon Community Schools
 Lincoln County School District, Newport
 Long Creek School District
 Lowell School District

M

 Mapleton School District
 Marcola School District
 McDermitt Elementary School District (Students attend McDermitt Combined School, K-12, in McDermitt, Nevada and Oregon, operated by the Humboldt County School District)
 McKenzie School District, Finn Rock
 McMinnville School District
 Medford School District
 Milton-Freewater Unified School District
 Mitchell School District
 Molalla River School District
 Monroe School District
 Monument School District
 Morrow School District, Lexington
 Mt. Angel School District
 Myrtle Point School District

N

 Neah-Kah-Nie School District, Rockaway Beach
 Nestucca Valley School District, Hebo
 Newberg School District
 North Bend School District
 North Clackamas School District, Milwaukie
 North Douglas School District, Drain
 North Lake School District, Silver Lake
 North Marion School District, Aurora
 North Powder School District
 North Santiam School District, Stayton
 North Wasco County School District (formerly The Dalles and Chenowith school districts)
 Nyssa School District

O

 Oakland School District
 Oakridge School District
 Ontario School District
 Oregon City School District
 Oregon Trail School District, Sandy

P

 Paisley School District
 Parkrose School District, Portland
 Pendleton School District
 Perrydale School District
 Philomath School District
 Phoenix-Talent School District
 Pilot Rock School District
 Pine Creek School District, Hines
 Pine Eagle School District, Halfway
 Pinehurst School District, Ashland
 Pleasant Hill School District
 Plush School District
 Port Orford-Langlois School District
 Portland Public Schools
 Powers School District
 Prairie City School District
 Prospect School District

R

 Rainier School District
 Redmond School District
 Reedsport School District
 Reynolds School District, Fairview
 Riddle School District
 Riverdale School District, Portland
 Rogue River School District
 Roseburg School District (Douglas County School District 4)

S

 St. Helens School District
 St. Paul School District
 Salem-Keizer School District
 Santiam Canyon School District, Mill City
 Scappoose School District
 Scio School District
 Seaside School District
 Sheridan School District
 Sherman County School District, Wasco
 Sherwood School District
 Silver Falls School District, Silverton
 Sisters School District
 Siuslaw School District, Florence
 South Harney School District, Fields
 South Lane School District, Cottage Grove
 South Umpqua School District, Myrtle Creek
 South Wasco County School District, Maupin
 Spray School District
 Springfield School District
 Stanfield School District
 Suntex School District, Hines
 Sutherlin School District
 Sweet Home School District

T

 Three Rivers/Josephine County School District, Murphy
 Tigard-Tualatin School District
 Tillamook School District
 Troy School District

U

 Ukiah School District
 Umatilla School District
 Union School District

V

 Vale School District
 Vernonia School District

W

 Wallowa School District
 Warrenton-Hammond School District
 West Linn-Wilsonville School District
 Willamina School District
 Winston-Dillard School District
 Woodburn School District

Y

 Yamhill-Carlton School District
 Yoncalla School District

Education service districts
Oregon has 19 education service districts.

 Clackamas Education Service District
 Columbia Gorge Education Service District
 Douglas Education Service District
 Grant County Education Service District
 Harney Education Service District
 High Desert Education Service District
 InterMountain Education Service District
 Jefferson County Education Service District
 Lake Education Service District
 Lane Education Service District
 Linn Benton Lincoln Education Service District
 Malheur Education Service District
 Multnomah Education Service District 
 North Central Education Service District
 Northwest Regional Education Service District 
 Region 18 - Wallowa Education Service District
 South Coast Education Service District
 Southern Oregon Education Service District
 Willamette Education Service District

See also
List of high schools in Oregon
Lists of Oregon-related topics

References

School Directory 2007–08, from Oregon Department of Education
Oregon Public School Districts, from Oregon School Boards Association

External links
History of School Funding: Outline, from Oregon School Boards Association

 
School districts
Oregon
School districts